San Raffaele may refer to:
Saint Raphael in the Italian language
San Raffaele Hospital, a hospital in Milan, Italy
Vita-Salute San Raffaele University, a university in Milan, Italy
San Raffaele Cimena, a municipality in the Province of Turin, Italy
Chiesa dell'Angelo San Raffaele (Venice), a church in Venice, Italy

See also 

 Raffaele